Consular assistance is help and advice provided by the diplomatic agents of a country to citizens of that country who are living or traveling overseas.

The diplomats may be honorary consuls, or members of the country's diplomatic service.

Such assistance may take the form of:
 provision of replacement travel documents
 advice and support in the case of an accident, serious illness, or death
 advice and support to victims of serious crime overseas, and arranging for next-of-kin to be informed
 visitation contact with incarcerated nationals
 liaison with local police officials in the case of nationals abducted or missing overseas
 loans to distressed travellers
 help during crises, such as civil unrest and natural disasters 
 facilitating the overseas payment of social welfare benefits
 registering citizen births abroad
 providing a list of local doctors and lawyers for medical and/or legal issues
 supervising their flag vessels in foreign harbours

Such assistance commonly does not extend to:
 storing luggage or valuables
 intervening in commercial disputes on behalf of their nationals
 providing travel agency, banking, or postal services
 money changing
 translation and interpreting services
 legal advice or advocacy
 negotiation of special treatment, bail, or early release from prison
 criminal investigation
 employment services

Vienna Convention on Consular Relations
At Article 5, the Vienna Convention on Consular Relations gives the most broad, detailed, and internationally accepted definition of 'consular functions':

See also
Vienna Convention on Consular Relations

References

Consular affairs
Passports
Assistance